Beauty Behind the Madness is the second studio album by Canadian singer the Weeknd, released on August 28, 2015, through XO and Republic Records. It features guest appearances from Labrinth, Ed Sheeran and Lana Del Rey. The album was executive produced by the Weeknd, DaHeala and Illangelo, and includes production from Kanye West, Stephan Moccio, Ben Billions, DannyBoyStyles, Max Martin, and Ali Payami, among others.

Five singles were released from Beauty Behind the Madness, including two US Billboard Hot 100 number-ones: "The Hills" and "Can't Feel My Face". The album also includes the Academy Award-nominated track "Earned It", which served as the lead single from the soundtrack to Fifty Shades of Grey. Beauty Behind the Madness received generally positive reviews from critics and debuted at number one in several countries. It marked the Weeknd's first number-one album in the United States, earning 412,000 album-equivalent units in its first week. It was the tenth best-selling album of 2015, according to the International Federation of the Phonographic Industry, with 1.5 million copies sold worldwide. At the 58th Annual Grammy Awards in 2016, Beauty Behind the Madness won Best Urban Contemporary Album and was nominated for Album of the Year.

Background
Following the success of his first compilation album Trilogy (2012) and the release of his debut studio album Kiss Land (2013), the Weeknd spoke to MTV about the two projects; describing them as the first and second chapters of his life 

Shortly after Kiss Land, the Weeknd began contributing to film soundtracks and other projects. He appeared on the soundtrack to The Hunger Games: Catching Fire (2013) on the song "Devil May Cry" and as a featured artist on Sia and Diplo's single "Elastic Heart". On September 30, 2014, the Weeknd appeared on Ariana Grande's single "Love Me Harder" from her second studio album My Everything. He then made an appearance on the soundtrack to Fifty Shades of Grey (2015) on the songs "Earned It" and "Where You Belong"; with the former track peaking at number three on the US Billboard Hot 100.

On July 5, 2015, during an interview on Beats 1 Radio, Ed Sheeran revealed that he had worked with the Weeknd on the album and that Kanye West was also involved. The Weeknd formally announced his second album on July 9 by revealing the album's title and sharing its artwork.

Composition 
Beauty Behind the Madness has been described by critics as a noticeable shift from the Weeknd's alternative R&B background to a more mainstream pop-oriented sound; with some of his original elements still intact.

In addition to its alt-R&B and pop sonics, Beauty Behind the Madness incorporates elements of disco, funk, soul, art rock, blues, and trap. Influences of Michael Jackson's Thriller (1982) and Bad (1987) are also present throughout the album. Lyrical themes include romance, success, loneliness, self-loathing, and independence.

Promotion

Tour

On June 26, 2014, the Weeknd announced the King of the Fall Tour, which spanned North America in September and October of that year. Schoolboy Q and Jhené Aiko appeared as supporting acts. The tour was announced the day after the Weeknd released the single "Often" on SoundCloud.

Performances
On July 4, 2015, the Weeknd headlined FVDED in the Park in Surrey, British Columbia, Canada. On July 9, the Weeknd continued to promote the album by headlining summer music festivals, including Lollapalooza in Chicago, the Hard Summer Music Festival in Pomona, California, the Summer Set Music and Camping Festival in Somerset, Wisconsin, Philadelphia's Made in America Festival, Austin City Limits in Austin, and Seattle's Bumbershoot Festival.

Singles
The first single, "Often", was released on July 31, 2014. The song peaked at number 59 and  number 69 on the US Billboard Hot 100 and Canadian Hot 100, respectively.

The album's second single, "The Hills", was released on May 27, 2015. The song peaked at number one on the Billboard Hot 100.

The album's third single, "Can't Feel My Face", was released on June 8, 2015, following the performance of the song by the Weeknd at Apple Worldwide Developers Conference on the same day. The song peaked at number one on the Billboard Hot 100.

"In the Night" was released to contemporary hit radio on November 17, 2015, as the album's fourth single in the United States. The song peaked at number 12 on the Billboard Hot 100.

"Acquainted" was released to urban contemporary radio on November 17, 2015, as the album's fifth and final single in the United States. It was also released to rhythmic contemporary on February 16, 2016. The song peaked at number 60 on the Billboard Hot 100.

Critical reception

Beauty Behind the Madness was met with generally positive reviews. At Metacritic, which assigns a normalized rating out of 100 to reviews from professional publications, the album received an average score of 74, based on 26 reviews. Aggregator AnyDecentMusic? gave it 6.9 out of 10, based on their assessment of the critical consensus.

Sheldon Pearce of The A.V. Club said, "It expertly and carefully closes the gap between the Weeknd's perception and his reality". Greg Kot of the Chicago Tribune said, "He's aiming for harder truths, creating pop that also works as a commentary on choice and consequence". Mackenzie Herd of Exclaim! said, "Beauty Behind the Madness proves that the Weeknd can thrive in the mainstream, and while the lyrics aren't overtly profound, he's proven that he is more versatile than previously thought, which is perhaps of greater importance at this stage in his career". Kyle Anderson of Entertainment Weekly said, "Anyone looking for a collection of homages to the King of Pop will be disappointed. Those masterpieces ["Can't Feel My Face" and "In The Night"] are outliers, and they end up making Madness missteps all the more jarring.... In the middle of those two poles lies a series of bass-heavy throb-and-moan blasts with the signature oddness (shape-shifting melodies, twitchy percussion) that makes the Weeknd a compelling artist". April Clare Welsh of NME said, "He may have softened his edge, upped the production and pulled in the stars, but the Weeknd remains an outsider". Andrew Ryce of Pitchfork said, "In the end, enjoying the Weeknd requires a certain suspension of disbelief, and that remains true on Beauty Behind the Madness. You really have to buy into his bad-guy persona.... For newcomers, there's a whole world to explore, and on Beauty Behind the Madness it's richer and smarter than ever".

Jon Dolan of Rolling Stone said, "If the sound has widened and even brightened in spots, the Weeknd still rocks a serious Eeyore vibe for much of Beauty Behind the Madness". Harley Brown of Spin said, "Beauty Behind the Madness is front-loaded with fresh directions for the Weeknd that achieve the impossible: make it sound like he's actually enjoying himself". Andy Kellman of AllMusic said, "The commercial strides are obvious. The creative advancements are less apparent, obstructed by some unappealing measures, but they're in there". Helen Brown of The Daily Telegraph said, "Real Life" builds up to a pitch of doomed drama from a corrosive slash of guitar as Tesfaye confides that even his "Mama called me destructive". But Ed Sheeran fails to rescue him on the tedious "Dark Times" and Lana Del Rey—who ought to be his perfect partner in pop-noir—adds nothing but a bored spritz of vocal perfume to the lethargic "Prisoner". Andy Gill of The Independent said, "Beauty Behind the Madness leaves one feeling just as estranged from Abel Tesfaye's depraved character as previous releases boasting less adhesive tunes". Kitty Empire of The Observer said, "The Weeknd's most conventional songs thus far are Sheeran's boringly retro "Dark Times", and "Shameless", a guitar ballad unredeemable even by its deranged guitar solo. Elsewhere, the step up is more convincing, if not always easy to listen to".

Rankings

Industry awards

Commercial performance

On August 31, 2015, Billboard estimated that Beauty Behind the Madness would sell approximately 300,000 copies during the first week of its release in the United States. The album debuted at number one on the Billboard 200 with 412,000 album-equivalent units; it sold 326,000 copies in its first week, with the remainder of its unit total reflecting its streaming activity and track sales. It marked the Weeknd's first number-one album. It remained atop the chart for the next two weeks and was the first album to spend three weeks at number one consecutively since Taylor Swift's 1989. The album also remained in the top 10 on the Billboard 200 for a total of 21 consecutive weeks. According to International Federation of the Phonographic Industry, Beauty Behind the Madness was the tenth best-selling album of 2015 worldwide. As of August 2017, the album has earned 3.7 million equivalent album units in the United States, of which 1.23 million are in traditional album sales. The set has also generated 2.05 billion on-demand audio streams for its songs.

Track listing

Notes
 signifies a co-producer
 signifies an additional producer
 signifies a remixer

Sample credits
 "Tell Your Friends" contains a sample of "Can't Stop Loving You", written by Carl Marshall and Robert Holmes, and performed by Soul Dog.
 "Often" contains a sample of "Ben Gene Sana Mecburum", performed by Nükhet Duru.

Personnel
Credits adapted from album's liner notes.

 Klas Åhlund – synth guitar solo (track 8)
 Andy Barnes – mixing assistant (track 4)
 Jonathan Martin Berry – guitars (tracks 1, 9, 14)
 Cory Bice – assistant engineer (tracks 7, 8, 10)
 Jay Paul Bicknell – engineer (tracks 1, 9, 14), programming and keyboards (tracks 1, 14), additional programming (track 9)
 Ben Billions – producer (tracks 4, 6, 11)
 Edie Lehmann Boddicker – children's choir director (track 14)
 Christopher Bradford – children's choir (track 14)
 David Bukovinszky – cello (track 8)
 Paul Bushnell – bass (tracks 1, 9, 14)
 Mattias Bylund – strings arranging, engineering, and editing (track 8)
 Peter Carlsson – vocal editing (tracks 7, 8, 10)
 Vinnie Colaiuta – additional percussion (track 14)
 Tom Coyne – mastering (tracks 1–3, 5–14)
 DannyBoyStyles – producer (tracks 6, 11)
 Mike Dean – co-producer and guitar (track 3)
 Lana Del Rey – vocals (track 13)
 Greg Eliason – mixing assistant (tracks 1, 14)
 Vanessa Freebairn-Smith – cello (track 1)
 Kyle Gaffney – assistant engineer (track 14)
 Serban Ghenea – mixing (tracks 7, 8, 10)
 Noah Goldstein – additional production and engineer (track 3)
 Aria Gunn – children's choir (track 14)
 Levi Gunn – children's choir (track 14)
 John Hanes – mix engineer (tracks 7, 8, 10)
 Sam Holland – engineer (tracks 7, 8, 10)
 Brandon "Bizzy" Hollemon – guitars (track 4)
 Jean-Marie Horvat – mixing (track 4)
 Mattias Johansson – violin (track 8)
 Dave Kutch – mastering (track 4)
 Labrinth – vocals, producer, programming, and instrumentation (track 2)
 Karissa Lee – children's choir |(track 14)
 Micah Lee – children's choir (track 14)
 Shane Lee – children's choir (track 14)
 Jeremy Lertola – assistant engineer (tracks 7, 8, 10)
 Max Martin – producer and additional programming (tracks 7, 8, 10)
 Joe Matthews – children's choir (track 14)
 Elle Moccio – children's choir (track 14)
 Stephan Moccio – producer, programming, and piano (tracks 1, 9, 14); keyboards and background vocals (tracks 1, 14); arranger (track 9)
 Mona – producer (track 5)
 Carlo "Illangelo" Montagnese – executive producer, producer (tracks 2, 5, 6, 11–13), co-producer (track 3), engineer (tracks 3, 5, 6, 11–13), mixing (tracks 2, 3, 5, 6, 11–13)
 Maty Noyes – guest artist vocals and background vocals (track 14)
 Evin O'Cleary – assistant engineer (track 9)
 Zola Odessa – children's choir (track 14)
 Ali Payami – producer, programming, drums, synthesizers, keyboards, and bass (tracks 7, 8, 10)
 Christopher "Che" Pope – producer (track 3)
 Jason "DaHeala" Quenneville – executive producer, producer (tracks 1, 4, 6, 9, 11), co-producer (track 4), engineer (tracks 2–4, 12), programming (track 1), additional vocal engineering (track 9)
 Dave Reitzas – additional programming (track 9), mixing (tracks 1, 9, 14)
 Omar Riad – additional production (track 3)
 Ed Sheeran – vocals (track 12)
 Joshua Smith – additional engineering (tracks 2, 3, 11–13)
 Peter Svensson – producer (track 8), guitars and additional keyboards (track 7), acoustic guitar and keyboards (track 8)
 Abel "The Weeknd" Tesfaye – lead vocals, executive producer, producer (tracks 1–4, 6, 11, 14), co-producer (tracks 8, 10, 13), arranger (track 2), programming (track 1), background vocals (tracks 1, 14)
 Claira Titman – children's choir (track 14)
 Emily Titman – children's choir (track 14)
 Kanye West – producer and backup vocals (track 3)

Charts

Weekly charts

Year-end charts

Decade-end charts

Certifications

Release history

See also
 List of number-one albums of 2015 (Australia)
 List of number-one albums of 2015 (Canada)
 List of UK Albums Chart number ones of the 2010s
 List of UK R&B Albums Chart number ones of 2015
 List of Billboard 200 number-one albums of 2015
 List of Billboard number-one R&B/hip-hop albums of 2015

References

2015 albums
Albums produced by Illangelo
Albums produced by Kanye West
Albums produced by Labrinth
Albums produced by Max Martin
Albums produced by Mike Dean (record producer)
Albums produced by the Weeknd
Grammy Award for Best Urban Contemporary Album
Republic Records albums
The Weeknd albums
Juno Award for Album of the Year albums
Juno Award for R&B/Soul Recording of the Year recordings